Acylita sanguifusa  is a species of moth of the family Noctuidae first described by E. Dukinfield Jones in 1908. It is found in Brazil. Its wingspan is about 26 mm.

Description
Head and thorax ochreous suffused with rufous; pectus whitish; legs brown; abdomen white slightly irrorated (sprinkled) with brown. Forewing whitish suffused with bright pink; a deep pink fascia in cell and thence obliquely to apex; the inner area deep pink; the terminal area with deep pink streaks in the interspaces. Hindwing white, the terminal area faintly irrorated with ochreous; the underside with the costal area suffused with ochreous.

References

Hadeninae
Moths of South America